The Drop Hydro Power Station is a Pacific Hydro hydroelectric power station on the Mulwala Canal, near Berrigan, New South Wales, Australia.

The power station was completed in November 2002, and is Australia's first hydroelectric power station built on an irrigation canal.

References

External links 

Pacific Hydro

Energy infrastructure completed in 2002
Hydroelectric power stations in New South Wales
2002 establishments in Australia